Beth Tfiloh Congregation is a Modern Orthodox congregation in Pikesville, Maryland, having 3,500 members. The synagogue seats 1,600 persons. Beth Tfiloh says it is the largest Modern Orthodox congregation in the U.S.

History

Beth Tfiloh Congregation was founded in Forest Park in 1921 with Rabbi Samuel Rosenblatt, son of Cantor Yossele Rosenblatt, who served in that capacity until 1972 when he was named Rabbi Emeritus. From 1972 to 1977, David Novak served as Chief Rabbi. He was succeeded by Mitchell Wohlberg, who served as Chief Rabbi of Beth Tfiloh Congregation from 1978 to 2021. In 2022, Rabbi Chai Posner succeeded Rabbi Wohlberg as senior Rabbi of the community. Rabbi Dr. Eli Yoggev serves as associate Rabbi, and Rabbi Chaim Wecker serves as ritual director.

Beth Tfiloh operates the Beth Tfiloh Dahan Community School in Pikesville for children from preschool to twelfth grade. The Congregation also operates the Beth Tfiloh Camp in Owings Mills on property acquired in 1951 as a camp for youth groups.

Beth El Congregation
In 1948, a group of nine lay leaders of Beth Tfiloh Congregation advocated for holding mixed-gender religious services and expanded b'nei mitzvah ceremonies. Their advocacy was unsuccessful, and instead they formed Beth El Congregation.

Beth Jacob Congregation
On March 8, 2007, Beth Tfiloh announced that it would merge with Beth Jacob Congregation, a 69-year-old congregation run at the time by Rabbi Gavriel Newman. Beth Jacob Congregation's membership had decreased over the years, and it was at about 500 in 2007, most of whom were age 75 or older. In a vote whether to go forward with the merger, 87 percent of Beth Jacob Congregation's members voted in favor. The merger happened in August 2007. Rabbi Newman decided to start a new congregation called Kehal Yaakov.

Winands Road Synagogue 
Winands Road Synagogue was chartered in 1985, and was the last-remaining synagogue in the once-thriving neighborhood of Randallstown. In 2016, the synagogue announced its decision to close its doors. In March 2018, a formal merger was announced between the two shuls, with Winands Road Synagogue members invited to formally join the Beth Tfiloh community and welcomed in a special Shabbat service in April 2018. The Winands Road building was later sold.

Notable members

 Benjamin Cardin, the senior U.S. senator from Maryland.

References

External links
 
  Maryland Historical Trust: History of Beth Tfiloh Congregation — on Garrison Blvd. in Baltimore (1927 to 1966) + Pikesville (1966 to present).

Jews and Judaism in Pikesville, Maryland
Modern Orthodox Judaism in Maryland
Modern Orthodox synagogues in the United States
Orthodox synagogues in Maryland
Religious buildings and structures in Pikesville, Maryland
Synagogues in Baltimore County, Maryland
Jews and Judaism in Baltimore
Synagogues in Baltimore
Jewish organizations established in 1927
1927 establishments in Maryland
Synagogues completed in 1927
Synagogues completed in 1966